Bob McHugh may refer to:
 Bob McHugh (footballer)
 Bob McHugh (musician)